Yates Township is located in McLean County, Illinois. As of the 2010 census, its population was 287 and it contained 121 housing units. Yates Township formed as Union Township from Chenoa Township on June 5, 1862. Union was changed to Yates sometime prior to 1920.

History

Yates Township is named after Governor Richard Yates.

Geography

Demographics

References

External links
City-data.com
Illinois State Archives

Townships in McLean County, Illinois
Townships in Illinois
1857 establishments in Illinois
Populated places established in 1857